Sir Jeremy James Hanley, KCMG (born 17 November 1945) is a politician and former chartered accountant from the United Kingdom. He served as the Chairman of the Conservative Party from 1994 to 1995, and as a member of parliament (MP) representing the constituency of Richmond and Barnes from 1983 to 1997.

Career

Hanley was educated at Rugby School, and began his career with Peat Marwick Mitchell & Company (now KPMG) as an articled clerk in 1963. He qualified as a chartered accountant in 1969, and as a certified accountant and chartered secretary in 1980. He joined the Financial Training Company, responsible for training chartered accountants, as a lecturer in Law and Accountancy (now Kaplan Financial Ltd), and rose to become the organisation's deputy chairman.

Hanley stood unsuccessfully as the Conservative Party candidate in the 1978 Lambeth Central by-election, and for the same seat in the general election the following year, before becoming the MP for Richmond and Barnes at the 1983 general election, narrowly defeating the SDP–Liberal Alliance candidate Alan Watson. On his first day in the House of Commons he ended up sitting next to Ian Paisley and introduced himself saying: "How do you do? I did not realise that you were on our side", to which Paisley replied: "Never confuse sitting on your side with being on your side."

Hanley was the Parliamentary Private Secretary (PPS) to Richard Luce from 1987 to 1990, and briefly the PPS to Chris Patten. He became an Under-Secretary of State at the Northern Ireland Office in 1990, and a Minister of State at the Ministry of Defence in 1993.

In 1994, Hanley was brought into the Cabinet by Prime Minister John Major, who made him the Chairman of the Conservative Party and a minister without portfolio. He served in this position until the 1995 Cabinet reshuffle, when he was moved to the non-Cabinet role of Minister of State at the Foreign Office, where he remained until the 1997 general election.

Hanley has been a member of the Privy Council since 1994.

In 1995, while party chairman, Hanley was confronted by several members of the fictional 'Jeremy Hanley fanclub' in the first episode of satirical TV series The Saturday Night Armistice.

Hanley's Richmond and Barnes constituency was abolished as part of a redrawing of constituency boundaries ahead of the 1997 election. He stood as the Conservative candidate for the new constituency of Richmond Park, but was defeated by the Liberal Democrat candidate Jenny Tonge.

Hanley was awarded a knighthood in John Major's farewell honours list in 1997. He is also a Freeman of the City of London, and Master of the Worshipful Company of Chartered Accountants.

Since leaving politics, Hanley has served on a number of company boards and as a director of the Arab-British Chamber of Commerce.

Personal life
Hanley is the son of actors Jimmy Hanley and Dinah Sheridan. His sister, Jenny Hanley, became an actress and TV presenter in the 1970s. In 1973 he married Verna, Viscountess Villiers, (née Stott, former wife of George Henry Child Villiers, Viscount Villiers, d. 1998) and had one son. He also had one son by a previous marriage and one step daughter.

He is a member of Mensa.

References
Times Guide to the House of Commons 1997

|-

|-

1945 births
Conservative Party (UK) MPs for English constituencies
Knights Commander of the Order of St Michael and St George
Living people
Members of the Privy Council of the United Kingdom
People educated at Rugby School
UK MPs 1983–1987
UK MPs 1987–1992
UK MPs 1992–1997
English people of Russian-Jewish descent
English people of German descent
Fellows of the Association of Chartered Certified Accountants
English accountants
Mensans
Chairmen of the Conservative Party (UK)
Northern Ireland Office junior ministers